Henry Clarke (1700–1777) was an Irish academic.

He was born in Ardress, County Armagh and educated at Trinity College Dublin. He became a Fellow of TCD in 1724 and Regius Professor of Divinity there in 1743. In 1746 he became Rector of Clonfeacle, a post he held until his death.

References
	

18th-century Irish Anglican priests
Alumni of Trinity College Dublin
Academics of Trinity College Dublin
1700 births
1777 deaths
Regius Professors of Divinity (University of Dublin)